The Iglesia de Santiago is a Neo-Gothic church in the locality of Sama, in the municipality of Langreo, Asturias, Spain.

A church similar in plan to the present, but simpler and not as tall, was first built in the 19th century and dedicated to San Eulogio. It was burned in October 1934, during the Spanish Civil War. It was rebuilt in the 1950s.

See also
Asturian art
Catholic Church in Spain

References

Churches in Asturias
19th-century Roman Catholic church buildings in Spain
Gothic Revival church buildings in Spain